Hymenosphecia is a genus of moths in the family Sesiidae containing only one species, Hymenosphecia albomaculata, which is known from Uganda.

References

Endemic fauna of Uganda
Sesiidae
Insects of Uganda
Moths of Africa